Middle Landing (2006 population:) is a Canadian rural community in Gloucester County, New Brunswick.  The community is Located mainly on Route 360 on the Nepisiguit River.

There are 3 Islands located with the community Limits:
Round Island
Middle Island
Dicks Island

History

Notable people

See also
List of communities in New Brunswick

References

Communities in Gloucester County, New Brunswick